The Department of Municipalities and Transport, formerly as Department of Municipal Affairs (DMA), is a regulatory authority of the Emirate of Abu Dhabi in the United Arab Emirates that is responsible for overseeing and supervising the Emirate's regional municipal councils and municipal administrations.

Responsibilities
The Department of Municipal Affairs achieves the general policies of Abu Dhabi Government by way of supervision and control over the municipal councils in the Abu Dhabi Emirate concerned in providing such services. The Department of Municipal Affairs is responsible for the following:

 To propose the draft laws, regulations related to the municipalities, municipal councils in the emirate of Abu Dhabi including the regulations related to the duties and dynamism of the business of municipalities and municipal councils.

The powers of the department are as follows:

 To propose establishing new municipalities.
 To propose the determination and amendment of the geographical sphere of municipalities and their boundaries to be approved by the Executive Council.
 To propose the amendments over the laws regulating the construction in the emirate of Abu Dhabi and the regulation and decisions as executed.
 To propose the draft laws related to the lands registration and to lay the standards of the relative policies and procedures.
 To propose the amendment of the charges of services rendered by the municipalities in the emirate.
 To propose the distribution of the fees income between the department and municipalities.
 To make sure that the applicable policies in the municipalities and municipal councils are in compliance with the policies of the Abu Dhabi Government.
 To receive the annual reports about the municipalities' achievements and municipal councils and municipalities and to file the same to the Executive Council supported with the assessment of the chairman and members of the council and working directors in case the Municipal Councils do not exist.
 To submit all matters and requests related to the Municipalities to the Executive Council.
 To lay a general frame to interact between the municipalities and Municipal Councils and the other governmental bodies in Abu Dhabi emirate in coordination with the municipalities constituted in the emirate.
 To coordinate with the authorities involved in preparing the architectural development in the emirate.
 To co-ordinate between the municipalities and councils and other departments in the emirate as well as to remove any obstacles for work.
 To coordinate among the municipalities in respect of the projects involved in the powers and mandates of some or all of these municipalities for the purposes of determining the best means for supervision over such projects.
 To support the municipalities and Municipal Councils in the emirate of Abu Dhabi and coordinate among each other in respect of developing the financial, administrative and human cadres and skills of the Municipal Council members and municipalities employees.
 To propose, provide and develop the culturing and training programs related to the municipal work of the municipality's employees in the emirate of Abu Dhabi.
 To represent the emirate in the conferences, forums concerned in the municipal affairs.
 To review the proposals of the strategic plans and as well as the budgets plan provided by the municipalities and Municipal Councils in the emirate of Abu Dhabi and to file the same to the Executive Council to be approved.

Current chairman
Majid Al Mansouri

H.E. Majed Ali Al Mansouri
Chairman of the Department of Municipal Affairs
Emirate of Abu Dhabi

H.E Majid Al Mansouri was Secretary General of the Environment Agency – Abu Dhabi (EAD) before becoming Chairman of the DMA.  He joined EAD ten years ago as Assistant Secretary General for Finance & Administration after serving 12 years with the Abu Dhabi National Oil Company Group (ADNOC). 

H.E Al Mansouri is also Managing Director of Al Ain Wildlife Park & Resort, Managing Director of the Center for Waste Management – Abu Dhabi, Executive Director of Emirates Falconers' Club and chairman of several technical committees. He also serves on the board of Abu Dhabi Sewerage Services Company. 

H.E. Majid Al Mansouri was born in 1967, and holds a BSc in Urban Planning from Alabama A & M University, Huntsville, Alabama, USA. In 2009, he was awarded the Gulf Cooperation Council's award for Best Environmental Personality in the UAE.

See also
 Qasr al-Hosn, the palace-fort, seat of government and palace of the rulers of Abu Dhabi ca. 1760/1790 to 1966.
 Mina' Zayid, the port of Abu Dhabi.
 Sheikh Zayed Mosque
 Emirates Palace Hotel, the most expensive hotel ($3 billion) ever built
 Al Ain
 Marawah, United Arab Emirates
 Dubai
 List of tallest buildings in Abu Dhabi
 Transportation in the United Arab Emirates

References

External links

 Department of Municipal Affairs Portal

2007 establishments in the United Arab Emirates
Organizations established in 2007

Organisations based in Abu Dhabi
Government agencies of Abu Dhabi